Svojšice may refer to:

Svojšice (Pardubice District), a village in Pardubice Region, Czech Republic
Svojšice (Kolín District), a village and municipality in Kolín District, Czech Republic
Svojšice (Příbram District), a village and municipality in Příbram District, Czech Republic